Guthrie railway station served the village of Guthrie, Angus, Scotland from 1838 to 1955 on the Arbroath and Forfar Railway.

History 
The station opened on 4 December 1838 by the Arbroath and Forfar Railway.  It closed to passengers on 5 December 1955 and closed to goods on 3 August 1959.

References

External links 

Disused railway stations in Angus, Scotland
Former Caledonian Railway stations
Railway stations in Great Britain opened in 1838
Railway stations in Great Britain closed in 1955